International law (also known as public international law and the law of nations) is the set of rules, norms, and standards generally recognized as binding between states. It establishes normative guidelines and a common conceptual framework for states across a broad range of domains, including war, diplomacy, economic relations, and human rights. Scholars distinguish between international legal institutions on the basis of their obligations (the extent to which states are bound to the rules), precision (the extent to which the rules are unambiguous), and delegation (the extent to which third parties have authority to interpret, apply and make rules). 

The sources of international law includes international custom (general state practice accepted as law), treaties, and general principles of law recognized by most national legal systems. Although international law may also be reflected in international comity—the practices adopted by states to maintain good relations and mutual recognition, such as saluting the flag of a foreign ship—such traditions are not legally binding.

International law differs from state-based legal systems in that it is primarily—though not exclusively—applicable to states, rather than to individuals, and operates largely through consent, since there is no universally accepted authority to enforce it upon sovereign states. Consequently, states may choose to not abide by international law, and even to breach a treaty. However, such violations, particularly of customary international law and peremptory norms (jus cogens), can be met with disapproval by others and in some cases coercive action (ranging from diplomatic and economic sanctions to war).

The relationship and interaction between a national legal system (municipal law) and international law is complex and variable. National law may become international law when treaties permit national jurisdiction to supranational tribunals such as the European Court of Human Rights or the International Criminal Court. Treaties such as the Geneva Conventions may require national law to conform to treaty provisions. National laws or constitutions may also provide for the implementation or integration of international legal obligations into domestic law.

Terminology 
The term "international law" is sometimes divided into "public" and "private" international law, particularly by civil law scholars or philosophers who seek to follow a Roman tradition. Roman lawyers would have further distinguished jus gentium, the law of nations, and jus inter gentes, agreements between nations. On this view, "public" international law is said to cover relations between nation-states and includes fields such as treaty law, law of sea, international criminal law, the laws of war or international humanitarian law, international human rights law, and refugee law. By contrast "private" international law, which is more commonly termed "conflict of laws", concerns whether courts within countries claim jurisdiction over cases with a foreign element, and which country's law applies.

When the modern system of (public) international law developed out of the tradition of the late medieval ius gentium, it was referred to as the law of nations, a direct translation of the concept ius gentium used by Hugo Grotius and droits des gens of  Emer de Vattel. The modern term international law was invented by Jeremy Bentham in 1789 and established itself in the 19th century.

A more recent concept is "supranational law", which concerns regional agreements where the laws of nation states may be held inapplicable when conflicting with a supranational legal system to which the nation has a treaty obligation. Systems of supranational law arise when nations explicitly cede their right to make certain judicial decisions to a common tribunal. The decisions of the common tribunal are directly effective in each party nation, and have priority over decisions taken by national courts. The European Union is the most prominent example of an international treaty organization that implements a supranational legal framework, with the European Court of Justice having supremacy over all member-nation courts in matter of European Union law.

The term "transnational law" is sometimes used to a body of rules of private law that transcend the nation state.

History 

The origins of international law can be traced back to antiquity. Among the earliest examples are peace treaties between the Mesopotamian city-states of Lagash and Umma (approximately 2100 BCE), and an agreement between the Egyptian pharaoh Ramses II and the Hittite king, Hattusilis III, concluded in 1258 BCE. Interstate pacts and agreements of various kinds were also negotiated and concluded by polities across the world, from the eastern Mediterranean to East Asia.

Ancient Greece, which developed basic notions of governance and international relations, contributed to the formation of the international legal system; many of the earliest peace treaties on record were concluded among the Greek city-states or with neighboring states. The Roman Empire established an early conceptual framework for international law, jus gentium ("law of nations"), which governed both the status of foreigners living in Rome and relations between foreigners and Roman citizens. Adopting the Greek concept of natural law, the Romans conceived of jus gentium as being universal. However, in contrast to modern international law, the Roman law of nations applied to relations with and between foreign individuals rather than among political units such as states.

Beginning with the Spring and Autumn period of the eighth century BCE, China was divided into numerous states that were often at war with each other. Subsequently, there emerged rules for diplomacy and treaty-making, including notions regarding the just grounds for war, the rights of neutral parties, and the consolidation and partition of states; these concepts were sometimes applied to relations with "barbarians" along China's western periphery beyond the Central Plains. The subsequent Warring States period saw the development of two major schools of thought, Confucianism and Legalism, both of which held that the domestic and international legal spheres were closely interlinked, and sought to establish competing normative principles to guide foreign relations. Similarly, the Indian subcontinent was characterized by an ever-changing panoply of states, which over time developed rules of neutrality, treaty law, and international conduct. Embassies both temporary and permanent were established between states to maintain diplomatic relations, and relations were conducted with distant states in Europe and East Asia.

Following the collapse of the western Roman Empire in the fifth century CE, Europe fragmented into numerous often-warring states for much of the next five centuries. Political power was dispersed across a range of entities, including the Church, mercantile city-states, and kingdoms, most of which had overlapping and ever-changing jurisdictions. As in China and India, these divisions prompted the development of rules aimed at providing stable and predictable relations. Early examples include canon law, which governed ecclesiastical institutions and clergy throughout Europe; the lex mercatoria  ("merchant law"), which concerned trade and commerce; and various codes of maritime law, such as the Rolls of Oléron—which drew from the ancient Roman Lex Rhodia—and the Laws of Wisby (Visby), enacted among the commercial Hanseatic League of northern Europe and the Baltic region.

Concurrently, in the Islamic world, foreign relations were guided based on the division of the world into three categories: The dar al-Islam (territory of Islam), where Islamic law prevailed; dar al-sulh (territory of treaty), non-Islamic realms that have concluded an armistice with a Muslim government; and dar al-harb (territory of war), non-Islamic lands whose rulers are called upon to accept Islam. Under the early Caliphate of the seventh century C.E., Islamic legal principles concerning military conduct and the treatment of prisoners of war served as precursors to modern international humanitarian law. Islamic law in this period institutionalised humanitarian limitations on military conduct, including attempts to limit the severity of war, guidelines for ceasing hostilities, distinguishing between civilians and combatants, preventing unnecessary destruction, and caring for the sick and wounded. The many requirements on how prisoners of war should be treated included providing shelter, food and clothing, respecting their cultures, and preventing any acts of execution, rape, or revenge. Some of these principles were not codified in Western international law until modern times.

During the European Middle Ages, international law was concerned primarily with the purpose and legitimacy of war, seeking to determine what constituted a "just war". For example, the theory of armistice held the nation that caused unwarranted war could not enjoy the right to obtain or conquer trophies that were legitimate at the time. The Greco-Roman concept of natural law was combined with religious principles by Jewish philosopher Moses Maimonides (1135–1204) and Christian theologian Thomas Aquinas (1225–1274) to create the new discipline of the "law of nations", which unlike its eponymous Roman predecessor applied natural law to relations between states. In Islam, a similar framework was developed wherein the law of nations was derived, in part, from the principles and rules set forth in treaties with non-Muslims.

Emergence of modern international law 
The 15th century witnessed a confluence of factors that contributed to an accelerated development of international law into its current framework. The influx of Greek scholars from the collapsing Byzantine Empire, along with the introduction of the printing press, spurred the development of science, humanism, and notions of individual rights. Increased navigation and exploration by Europeans challenged scholars to devise a conceptual framework for relations with different peoples and cultures. The formation of centralized states such as Spain and France brought more wealth, ambition, and trade, which in turn required increasingly more sophisticated rules and regulations.

The Italian peninsula, divided among various city-states with complex and often fractious relationships, was subsequently an early incubator of international law theory. Jurist and law professor Bartolus da Saxoferrato (1313–1357), who was well versed in Roman and Byzantine law, contributed to the increasingly relevant area of "conflicts of law", which concerns disputes between private individuals and entities in different sovereign jurisdictions; he is thus considered the founder of private international law. Another Italian jurist and law professor, Baldus de Ubaldis (1327–1400), provided voluminous commentaries and compilations of Roman, ecclesiastical, and feudal law, thus creating an organized source of law that could be referenced by different nations. The most famous contributor from the region, Alberico Gentili (1552–1608), is considered a founder of international law, authoring one of the earliest works on the subject, De Legationibus Libri Tres, in 1585. He wrote several more books on various issues in international law, notably De jure belli libri tres (Three Books on the Law of War), which provided comprehensive commentary on the laws of war and treaties, 

Spain, whose global empire spurred a golden age of economic and intellectual development in the 16th and 17th centuries, produced major contributors to international law. Francisco de Vitoria (1486–1546), who was concerned with the treatment of the indigenous peoples by Spain, invoked the law of nations as a basis for their innate dignity and rights, articulating an early version of sovereign equality between peoples. Francisco Suárez (1548–1617) emphasized that international law was founded upon the law of nature.
The Dutch jurist Hugo Grotius (1583–1645) is widely regarded as the most seminal figure in international law, being one of the first scholars to articulate an international order that consists of a "society of states" governed not by force or warfare but by actual laws, mutual agreements, and customs. Grotius secularized international law and organized it into a comprehensive system; his 1625 work, De Jure Belli ac Pacis (On the Law of War and Peace), laid down a system of principles of natural law that bind all nations regardless of local custom or law. He also emphasized the freedom of the high seas, which was not only relevant to the growing number of European states exploring and colonising the world, but remains a cornerstone of international law today. Although the modern study of international law would not begin until the early 19th century, the 16th-century scholars Gentili, Vitoria and Grotius laid the foundations and are widely regarded as the "fathers of international law".

Grotius inspired two nascent schools of international law, the naturalists and the positivists. In the former camp was German jurist Samuel von Pufendorf (1632–94), who stressed the supremacy of the law of nature over states. His 1672 work, De iure naturae et gentium, expanded on the theories of Grotius and grounded natural law to reason and the secular world, asserting that it regulates only the external acts of states. Pufendorf challenged the Hobbesian notion that the state of nature was one of war and conflict, arguing that the natural state of the world is actually peaceful but weak and uncertain without adherence to the law of nations. The actions of a state consist of nothing more than the sum of the individuals within that state, thereby requiring the state to apply a fundamental law of reason, which is the basis of natural law. He was among the earliest scholars to expand international law beyond European Christian nations, advocating for its application and recognition among all peoples on the basis of shared humanity.

In contrast, positivist writers, such as Richard Zouche (1590–1661) in England and Cornelis van Bynkershoek (1673–1743) in the Netherlands, argued that international law should derive from the actual practice of states rather than Christian or Greco-Roman sources. The study of international law shifted away from its core concern on the law of war and towards the domains such as the law of the sea and commercial treaties. The positivist school made use of the new scientific method and was in that respect consistent with the empiricist and inductive approach to philosophy that was then gaining acceptance in Europe.

Establishment of "Westphalian system" 

The developments of the 17th century came to a head at the conclusion of the "Peace of Westphalia" in 1648, which is considered to be the seminal event in international law. The resulting "Westphalian sovereignty" established the current international legal order characterized by independent sovereign entities known as "nation states", which have equality of sovereignty regardless of size and power, defined primarily by the inviolability of borders and non-interference in the domestic affairs of sovereign states. From this period onward, the concept of the nation-state evolved rapidly, and with it the development of complex relations that required predictable, widely accepted rules and guidelines. The idea of nationalism, in which people began to see themselves as citizens of a particular group with a distinct national identity, further solidified the concept and formation of nation-states.

Elements of the naturalist and positivist schools became synthesised, most notably by German philosopher Christian Wolff (1679–1754) and Swiss jurist Emerich de Vattel (1714–67), both of whom sought a middle-ground approach in international law. During the 18th century, the positivist tradition gained broader acceptance, although the concept of natural rights remained influential in international politics, particularly through the republican revolutions of the United States and France. Not until the 20th century would natural rights gain further salience in international law.

Several legal systems developed in Europe, including the codified systems of continental European states known as civil law, and English common law, which is based on decisions by judges and not by written codes. Other areas around the world developed differing legal systems, with the Chinese legal tradition dating back more than four thousand years, although at the end of the 19th century, there was still no written code for civil proceedings in China.

Until the mid-19th century, relations between states were dictated mostly by treaties, agreements between states to behave in a certain way, unenforceable except by force, and nonbinding except as matters of honor and faithfulness. One of the first instruments of modern international law was the Lieber Code of 1863, which governed the conduct of U.S. forces during the U.S. Civil War, and is considered to be the first written recitation of the rules and articles of war adhered to by all civilized nations. This led to the first prosecution for war crimes, in which a Confederate commandant was tried and hanged for holding prisoners of war in cruel and depraved conditions at Andersonville, Georgia. In the years that followed, other states subscribed to limitations of their conduct, and numerous other treaties and bodies were created to regulate the conduct of states towards one another, including the Permanent Court of Arbitration in 1899, and the Hague and Geneva Conventions, the first of which was passed in 1864.

The concept of sovereignty was spread throughout the world by European powers, which had established colonies and spheres of influences over virtually every society. Positivism reached its peak in the late 19th century and its influence began to wane following the unprecedented bloodshed of the First World War, which spurred the creation of international organisations such as the League of Nations, founded in 1919 to safeguard peace and security. International law began to incorporate more naturalist notions such as self determination and human rights. The Second World War accelerated this development, leading to the establishment of the United Nations, whose Charter enshrined principles such as nonaggression, nonintervention, and collective security. A more robust international legal order followed, which was buttressed by institutions such as the International Court of Justice and the United Nations Security Council, and by multilateral agreements such as the Genocide Convention. The International Law Commission (ILC) was established in 1947 to help develop, codify, and strengthen international law

Having become geographically international through the colonial expansion of the European powers, international law became truly international in the 1960s and 1970s, when rapid decolonisation across the world resulted in the establishment of scores of newly independent states. The varying political and economic interests and needs of these states, along with their diverse cultural backgrounds, infused the hitherto European-dominated principles and practices of international law with new influences. A flurry of institutions, ranging from the World Health Organisation to the World Trade Organisation, furthered the development of a stable, predictable legal order with rules governing virtually every domain. The phenomenon of globalisation, which has led to the rapid integration of the world in economic, political, and even cultural terms, presents one of the greatest challenges to devising a truly international legal system.

Sources of international law 

Sources of international law have been influenced by a range of political and legal theories. During the 20th century, it was recognized by legal positivists that a sovereign state could limit its authority to act by consenting to an agreement according to the contract principle pacta sunt servanda. This consensual view of international law was reflected in the 1920 Statute of the Permanent Court of International Justice, and remains preserved in Article 7 of the ICJ Statute. The sources of international law applied by the community of nations are listed under Article 38 of the Statute of the International Court of Justice, which is considered authoritative in this regard:

 International treaties and conventions; 
 International custom as derived from the "general practice" of states; and
 General legal principles "recognized by civilized nations".

Additionally, judicial decisions and the teachings of prominent international law scholars may be applied as "subsidiary means for the determination of rules of law".

Many scholars agree that the fact that the sources are arranged sequentially suggests an implicit hierarchy of sources. However, the language of Article 38 does not explicitly hold such a hierarchy, and the decisions of the international courts and tribunals do not support such a strict hierarchy. By contrast, Article 21 of the Rome Statute of the International Criminal Court clearly defines a hierarchy of applicable law (or sources of international law).

Treaties 
International treaty law comprises obligations expressly and voluntarily accepted by states between themselves in treaties. The Vienna Convention on the Law of Treaties defines a treaty as follows:
"treaty" means an international agreement concluded between States in written form and governed by international law, whether embodied in a single instrument or in two or more related instruments and whatever its particular designation
This definition has led case-law to define a treaty as an international agreement that meets the following criteria:

 Criterion 1: Requirement of an agreement, meetings of wills (concours de volonté)
 Criterion 2: Requirement of being concluded between subjects of international law: this criterion excludes agreements signed between States and private corporations, such as Production Sharing Agreements. In the 1952 United Kingdom v Iran case, the ICJ did not have jurisdiction for a dispute over the Anglo-Iranian Oil Company being nationalized as the dispute emerged from an alleged breach of contract between a private company and a State.
 Criterion 3: Requirement to be governed by international law: any agreement governed by any domestic law will not be considered a treaty.
 Criterion 4: No requirement of instrument: A treaty can be embodied in a single instrument or in two or more related instruments. This is best exemplified in exchange of letters - (échange de lettres). For example, if France sends a letter to the United States to say, increase their contribution in the budget of the North Atlantic Alliance, and the US accepts the commitment, a treaty can be said to have emerged from the exchange.
 Criterion 5: No requirement of designation: the designation of the treaty, whether it is a "convention", "pact" or "agreement" has no impact on the qualification of said agreement as being a treaty.
 Unwritten Criterion: requirement for the agreement to produce legal effects: this unwritten criterion is meant to exclude agreements which fulfill the above-listed conditions, but are not meant to produce legal effects, such as Memoranda of Understanding.

Where there are disputes about the exact meaning and application of national laws, it is the responsibility of the courts to decide what the law means. In international law, interpretation is within the domain of the states concerned, but may also be conferred on judicial bodies such as the International Court of Justice, by the terms of the treaties or by consent of the parties. Thus, while it is generally the responsibility of states to interpret the law for themselves, the processes of diplomacy and availability of supra-national judicial organs routinely provide assistance to that end.

The Vienna Convention on the Law of Treaties, which codifies several bedrock principles of treaty interpretation, holds that a treaty "shall be interpreted in good faith in accordance with the ordinary meaning to be given to the terms of the treaty in their context and in the light of its object and purpose." This represents a compromise between three different theories of interpretation:

 The textual approach, a restrictive interpretation that looks to the "ordinary meaning" of the text, assigning considerable weight to the actual text.
 The subjective approach, which takes into consideration factors such as the ideas behind the treaty, the context of the treaty's creation, and what the drafters intended.
 The effective approach, which interprets a treaty "in the light of its object and purpose", i.e. based on what best suits the goal of the treaty.

The foregoing are general rules of interpretation, and do no preclude the application of specific rules for particular areas of international law.

Greece v United Kingdom [1952] ICJ 1, ICJ had no jurisdiction to hear a dispute between the UK government and a private Greek businessman under the terms of a treaty.
United Kingdom v Iran [1952] ICJ 2, the ICJ did not have jurisdiction for a dispute over the Anglo-Iranian Oil Company being nationalized.
Oil Platforms case (Islamic Republic of Iran v United States of America) [2003] ICJ 4, rejected dispute over damage to ships which hit a mine.

International custom 
Customary international law is derived from the consistent practice of States accompanied by opinio juris, i.e. the conviction of states that the consistent practice is required by a legal obligation. Judgments of international tribunals as well as scholarly works have traditionally been looked to as persuasive sources for custom in addition to direct evidence of state behavior. Attempts to codify customary international law picked up momentum after the Second World War with the formation of the International Law Commission (ILC) under the aegis of the UN. Codified customary law is made the binding interpretation of the underlying custom by agreement through treaty. For states not party to such treaties, the work of the ILC may still be accepted as custom applying to those states. General principles of law are those commonly recognized by the major legal systems of the world. Certain norms of international law achieve the binding force of peremptory norms (jus cogens) as to include all states with no permissible derogations.

Colombia v Perú  (1950), recognizing custom as a source of international law, but a practice of giving asylum was not part of it.
Belgium v Spain (1970), finding that only the state where a corporation is incorporated (not where its major shareholders reside) has standing to bring an action for damages for economic loss.

Statehood and responsibility 

International law establishes the framework and the criteria for identifying states as the fundamental actors in the international legal system. As the existence of a state presupposes control and jurisdiction over territory, international law deals with the acquisition of territory, state immunity and the legal responsibility of states in their conduct with each other. International law is similarly concerned with the treatment of individuals within state boundaries. There is thus a comprehensive regime dealing with group rights, the treatment of aliens, the rights of refugees, international crimes, nationality problems, and human rights generally. It further includes the important functions of the maintenance of international peace and security, arms control, the pacific settlement of disputes and the regulation of the use of force in international relations. Even when the law is not able to stop the outbreak of war, it has developed principles to govern the conduct of hostilities and the treatment of prisoners. International law is also used to govern issues relating to the global environment, the global commons such as international waters and outer space, global communications, and world trade.

In theory, all states are sovereign and equal. As a result of the notion of sovereignty, the value and authority of international law is dependent upon the voluntary participation of states in its formulation, observance, and enforcement. Although there may be exceptions, it is thought by many international academics that most states enter into legal commitments with other states out of enlightened self-interest rather than adherence to a body of law that is higher than their own. As D. W. Greig notes, "international law cannot exist in isolation from the political factors operating in the sphere of international relations".

Traditionally, sovereign states and the Holy See were the sole subjects of international law. With the proliferation of international organizations over the last century, they have in some cases been recognized as relevant parties as well. Recent interpretations of international human rights law, international humanitarian law, and international trade law (e.g., North American Free Trade Agreement (NAFTA) Chapter 11 actions) have been inclusive of corporations, and even of certain individuals.

The conflict between international law and national sovereignty is subject to vigorous debate and dispute in academia, diplomacy, and politics. Indeed, there is a growing trend toward judging a state's domestic actions in the light of international law and standards. Numerous people now view the nation-state as the primary unit of international affairs and believe that only states may choose to enter into commitments under international law voluntarily and that they have the right to follow their own counsel when it comes to the interpretation of their commitments. Certain scholars and political leaders feel that these modern developments endanger nation-states by taking power away from state governments and ceding it to international bodies such as the U.N. and the World Bank, argue that international law has evolved to a point where it exists separately from the mere consent of states, and discern a legislative and judicial process to international law that parallels such processes within domestic law.  This especially occurs when states violate or deviate from the expected standards of conduct adhered to by all civilized nations.

A number of states place emphasis on the principle of territorial sovereignty, thus seeing states as having free rein over their internal affairs. Other states oppose this view. One group of opponents of this point of view, including many Europe nations, maintain that all civilized nations have certain norms of conduct expected of them, including the prohibition of genocide, slavery and the slave trade, wars of aggression, torture, and piracy, and that violation of these universal norms represents a crime, not only against the individual victims, but against humanity as a whole. States and individuals who subscribe to this view opine that, in the case of the individual responsible for violation of international law, he "is become, like the pirate and the slave trader before him, hostis humani generis, an enemy of all mankind", and thus subject to prosecution in a fair trial before any fundamentally just tribunal, through the exercise of universal jurisdiction.

Though European democracies tend to support broad, universalistic interpretations of international law, many other democracies have differing views on international law. Several democracies, including India, Israel and the United States, take a flexible, eclectic approach, recognizing aspects of international law such as territorial rights as universal, regarding other aspects as arising from treaty or custom, and viewing certain aspects as not being subjects of international law at all. Democracies in the developing world, due to their past colonial histories, often insist on non-interference in their internal affairs, particularly regarding human rights standards or their peculiar institutions, but often strongly support international law at the bilateral and multilateral levels, such as in the United Nations, and especially regarding the use of force, disarmament obligations, and the terms of the UN Charter.

Case Concerning United States Diplomatic and Consular Staff in Tehran [1980] ICJ 1
Democratic Republic of the Congo v Belgium [2002] ICJ 1

Territory and the sea 
The law of the sea is the area of international law concerning the principles and rules by which states and other entities interact in maritime matters. It encompasses areas and issues such as navigational rights, sea mineral rights, and coastal waters jurisdiction. The law of the sea is distinct from admiralty law (also known as maritime law), which concerns relations and conduct at sea by private entities.

The United Nations Convention on the Law of the Sea (UNCLOS), concluded in 1982 and coming into force in 1994, is generally accepted as a codification of customary international law of the sea.

Territorial dispute
Libya v Chad [1994] ICJ 1
United Kingdom v Norway [1951] ICJ 3, the Fisheries case, concerning the limits of Norway's jurisdiction over neighboring waters
Peru v Chile (2014) dispute over international waters.
Bakassi case [2002] ICJ 2, between Nigeria and Cameroon
Burkina Faso-Niger frontier dispute case (2013)
United Nations Convention on the Law of the Sea
Corfu Channel Case [1949] ICJ 1, UK sues Albania for damage to ships in international waters. First ICJ decision.
France v United Kingdom [1953] ICJ 3
Germany v Denmark and the Netherlands [1969] ICJ 1, successful claim for a greater share of the North Sea continental shelf by Germany. The ICJ held that the matter ought to be settled, not according to strict legal rules, but through applying equitable principles.
Case concerning maritime delimitation in the Black Sea (Romania v Ukraine) [2009] ICJ 3

International organizations 

United Nations
World Trade Organization
International Labour Organization
NATO
European Union
G7 and G20
OPEC
Organisation of Islamic Cooperation
Food and Agriculture Organization
World Health Organization

Social and economic policy 

Netherlands v Sweden [1958] ICJ 8, Sweden had jurisdiction over its guardianship policy, meaning that its laws overrode a conflicting guardianship order of the Netherlands.
Liechtenstein v Guatemala [1955] ICJ 1, the recognition of Mr Nottebohm's nationality, connected to diplomatic protection.
Italy v France, United Kingdom and United States [1954] ICJ 2

Human rights 

Universal Declaration of Human Rights
Croatia–Serbia genocide case (2014) ongoing claims over genocide.
Bosnia and Herzegovina v Serbia and Montenegro [2007] ICJ 2
Case Concerning Barcelona Traction, Light, and Power Company, Ltd [1970] ICJ 1

Labor law 

International Labor Organization
ILO Conventions
Declaration of Philadelphia of 1944
Declaration on Fundamental Principles and Rights at Work of 1998
United Nations Convention on the Protection of the Rights of All Migrant Workers and Members of Their Families
 the Convention on the Elimination of All Forms of Racial Discrimination 1965
Convention on the Elimination of All Forms of Discrimination Against Women 1981);
 the Convention on the Rights of Persons with Disabilities 2008

Development and finance 

Bretton Woods Conference
World Bank
International Monetary Fund

Environmental law 

Kyoto Protocol

Trade 

World Trade Organization
Trans-Pacific Partnership (TPP): The TPP is a proposed free trade agreement among 11 Pacific Rim economies, focusing on tariff reductions. It was the centerpiece of President Barack Obama's strategic pivot to Asia. Before President Donald J. Trump withdrew the United States in 2017, the TPP was set to become the world's largest free trade deal, covering 40 percent of the global economy. 
Regional Comprehensive Economic Partnership (RCEP): The RCEP is a free trade agreement between the Asia-Pacific nations of Australia, Brunei, Cambodia, China, Indonesia, Japan, Laos, Malaysia, Myanmar, New Zealand, the Philippines, Singapore, South Korea, Thailand, and Vietnam. It includes the 10 ASEAN members plus 6 ASEAN foreign partners. The 16 nations signed the agreement on 15 November 2020, via tele-conference. The deal excludes the US, which withdrew from a rival Asia-Pacific trade pact in 2017. RCEP will connect about 30% of the world's people and output and, in the right political context, will generate significant gains. RCEP aims to create an integrated market with 16 countries, making it easier for products and services of each of these countries to be available across this region. The negotiations are focused on the following: Trade in goods and services, investment, intellectual property, dispute settlement, e-commerce, small and medium enterprises, and economic cooperation.

Conflict and force

War and armed conflict 

Nicaragua v. United States [1986] ICJ 1
International Court of Justice advisory opinion on the Legality of the Threat or Use of Nuclear Weapons

Humanitarian law 

First Geneva Convention of 1949, Amelioration of the Condition of the Wounded and Sick in Armed Forces in the Field, (first adopted in 1864)
Second Geneva Convention of 1949, Amelioration of the Condition of Wounded, Sick and Shipwrecked Members of Armed Forces at Sea (first adopted in 1906)
Third Geneva Convention of 1949, Treatment of Prisoners of War, adopted in 1929, following from the Hague Conventions of 1899 and 1907.
Fourth Geneva Convention of 1949, Protection of Civilian Persons in Time of War.

International criminal law 

 International Criminal Tribunal for Rwanda
 International Criminal Tribunal for the Former Yugoslavia

Courts and enforcement 

Since international law has no established compulsory judicial system for the settlement of disputes or a coercive penal system, it is not as straightforward as managing breaches within a domestic legal system. However, there are means by which breaches are brought to the attention of the international community and some means for resolution. For example, there are judicial or quasi-judicial tribunals in international law in certain areas such as trade and human rights. The formation of the United Nations, for example, created a means for the world community to enforce international law upon members that violate its charter through the Security Council.

Since international law exists in a legal environment without an overarching "sovereign" (i.e., an external power able and willing to compel compliance with international norms), "enforcement" of international law is very different from in the domestic context. In many cases, enforcement takes on Coasian characteristics, where the norm is self-enforcing.  In other cases, defection from the norm can pose a real risk, particularly if the international environment is changing.  When this happens, and if enough states (or enough powerful states) continually ignore a particular aspect of international law, the norm may actually change according to concepts of customary international law.  For example, prior to World War I, unrestricted submarine warfare was considered a violation of international law and ostensibly the casus belli for the United States' declaration of war against Germany.  By World War II, however, the practice was so widespread that during the Nuremberg trials, the charges against German Admiral Karl Dönitz for ordering unrestricted submarine warfare were dropped, notwithstanding that the activity constituted a clear violation of the Second London Naval Treaty of 1936.

Domestic enforcement 
Apart from a state's natural inclination to uphold certain norms, the force of international law comes from the pressure that states put upon one another to behave consistently and to honor their obligations. As with any system of law, many violations of international law obligations are overlooked. If addressed, it may be through diplomacy and the consequences upon an offending state's reputation, submission to international judicial determination, arbitration, sanctions or force including war. Though violations may be common in fact, states try to avoid the appearance of having disregarded international obligations. States may also unilaterally adopt sanctions against one another such as the severance of economic or diplomatic ties, or through reciprocal action. In some cases, domestic courts may render judgment against a foreign state (the realm of private international law) for an injury, though this is a complicated area of law where international law intersects with domestic law.

It is implicit in the Westphalian system of nation-states, and explicitly recognized under Article 51 of the Charter of the United Nations, that all states have the inherent right to individual and collective self-defense if an armed attack occurs against them. Article 51 of the UN Charter guarantees the right of states to defend themselves until (and unless) the Security Council takes measures to keep the peace.

International bodies

As a "deliberative, policymaking and representative organ", the United Nations General Assembly "is empowered to make recommendations"; it can neither codify international law nor make binding resolutions. Merely internal resolutions, such as budgetary matters, may be binding on the operation of the General Assembly itself. Violations of the UN Charter by members of the United Nations may be raised by the aggrieved state in the General Assembly for debate.

General Assembly resolutions are generally non-binding towards member states, but through its adoption of the "Uniting for Peace" resolution (A/RES/377 A), of 3 November 1950, the Assembly declared that it had the power to authorize the use of force, under the terms of the UN Charter, in cases of breaches of the peace or acts of aggression, provided that the Security Council, owing to the negative vote of a permanent member, fails to act to address the situation. The Assembly also declared, by its adoption of resolution 377 A, that it could call for other collective measures—such as economic and diplomatic sanctions—in situations constituting the milder "threat to the Peace".

The Uniting for Peace resolution was initiated by the United States in 1950, shortly after the outbreak of the Korean War, as a means of circumventing possible future Soviet vetoes in the Security Council. The legal role of the resolution is clear, given that the General Assembly can neither issue binding resolutions nor codify law. It was never argued by the "Joint Seven-Powers" that put forward the draft resolution, during the corresponding discussions, that it in any way afforded the Assembly new powers. Instead, they argued that the resolution simply declared what the Assembly's powers already were, according to the UN Charter, in the case of a dead-locked Security Council. The Soviet Union was the only permanent member of the Security Council to vote against the Charter interpretations that were made recommendation by the Assembly's adoption of resolution 377 A.

Alleged violations of the Charter can also be raised by states in the Security Council. The Security Council could subsequently pass resolutions under Chapter VI of the UN Charter to recommend the "Pacific Resolution of Disputes." Such resolutions are not binding under international law, though they usually are expressive of the council's convictions.  In rare cases, the Security Council can adopt resolutions under Chapter VII of the UN Charter, related to "threats to Peace, Breaches of the Peace and Acts of Aggression," which are legally binding under international law, and can be followed up with economic sanctions, military action, and similar uses of force through the auspices of the United Nations.

It has been argued that resolutions passed outside of Chapter VII can also be binding; the legal basis for that is the council's broad powers under Article 24(2), which states that "in discharging these duties (exercise of primary responsibility in international peace and security), it shall act in accordance with the Purposes and Principles of the United Nations". The mandatory nature of such resolutions was upheld by the International Court of Justice  (ICJ) in its advisory opinion on Namibia. The binding nature of such resolutions can be deduced from an interpretation of their language and intent.

States can also, upon mutual consent, submit disputes for arbitration by the International Court of Justice, located in The Hague, Netherlands. The judgments given by the court in these cases are binding, although it possesses no means to enforce its rulings.
The Court may give an advisory opinion on any legal question at the request of whatever body may be authorized by or in accordance with the Charter of the United Nations to make such a request. Some of the advisory cases brought before the court have been controversial with respect to the court's competence and jurisdiction.

Often enormously complicated matters, ICJ cases (of which there have been less than 150 since the court was created from the Permanent Court of International Justice in 1945) can stretch on for years and generally involve thousands of pages of pleadings, evidence, and the world's leading specialist international lawyers. As of November 2019, there are 16 cases pending at the ICJ. Decisions made through other means of arbitration may be binding or non-binding depending on the nature of the arbitration agreement, whereas decisions resulting from contentious cases argued before the ICJ are always binding on the involved states.

Though states (or increasingly, international organizations) are usually the only ones with standing to address a violation of international law, some treaties, such as the International Covenant on Civil and Political Rights have an optional protocol that allows individuals who have had their rights violated by member states to petition the international Human Rights Committee. Investment treaties commonly and routinely provide for enforcement by individuals or investing entities. and commercial agreements of foreigners with sovereign governments may be enforced on the international plane.

International courts
There are numerous international bodies created by treaties adjudicating on legal issues where they may have jurisdiction. The only one claiming universal jurisdiction is the United Nations Security Council. Others are: the United Nations International Court of Justice, and the International Criminal Court (when national systems have totally failed and the Treaty of Rome is applicable) and the Court of Arbitration for Sport.

East African Community

There were ambitions to make the East African Community, consisting of Kenya, Tanzania, Uganda, Burundi and Rwanda, a political federation with its own form of binding supranational law, but this effort has not materialized.

Union of South American Nations

The Union of South American Nations serves the South American continent. It intends to establish a framework akin to the European Union by the end of 2019. It is envisaged to have its own passport and currency, and limit barriers to trade.

Andean Community of Nations

The Andean Community of Nations is the first attempt to integrate the countries of the Andes Mountains in South America. It started with the Cartagena Agreement of 26 May 1969, and consists of four countries: Bolivia, Colombia, Ecuador and Peru. The Andean Community follows supranational laws, called Agreements, which are mandatory for these countries.

International legal theory

International legal theory comprises a variety of theoretical and methodological approaches used to explain and analyse the content, formation and effectiveness of international law and institutions and to suggest improvements. Some approaches center on the question of compliance: why states follow international norms in the absence of a coercive power that ensures compliance. Other approaches focus on the problem of the formation of international rules: why states voluntarily adopt international law norms, that limit their freedom of action, in the absence of a world legislature; while other perspectives are policy oriented: they elaborate theoretical frameworks and instruments to criticize the existing norms and to make suggestions on how to improve them. Some of these approaches are based on domestic legal theory, some are interdisciplinary, and others have been developed expressly to analyse international law. Classical approaches to International legal theory are the Natural law, the Eclectic and the Legal positivism schools of thought.

The natural law approach argues that international norms should be based on axiomatic truths. The 16th-century natural law writer, Francisco de Vitoria, a professor of theology at the University of Salamanca, examined the questions of the just war, the Spanish authority in the Americas, and the rights of the Native American peoples.

In 1625 Hugo Grotius argued that nations as well as persons ought to be governed by universal principle based on morality and divine justice while the relations among polities ought to be governed by the law of peoples, the jus gentium, established by the consent of the community of nations on the basis of the principle of pacta sunt servanda, that is, on the basis of the observance of commitments. On his part, Emmerich de Vattel argued instead for the equality of states as articulated by 18th-century natural law and suggested that the law of nations was composed of custom and law on the one hand, and natural law on the other. During the 17th century, the basic tenets of the Grotian or eclectic school, especially the doctrines of legal equality, territorial sovereignty, and independence of states, became the fundamental principles of the European political and legal system and were enshrined in the 1648 Peace of Westphalia.

The early positivist school emphasized the importance of custom and treaties as sources of international law. In the 16th-century, Alberico Gentili used historical examples to posit that positive law (jus voluntarium) was determined by general consent. Cornelius van Bynkershoek asserted that the bases of international law were customs and treaties commonly consented to by various states, while John Jacob Moser emphasized the importance of state practice in international law. The positivism school narrowed the range of international practice that might qualify as law, favouring rationality over morality and ethics. The 1815 Congress of Vienna marked the formal recognition of the political and international legal system based on the conditions of Europe.

Modern legal positivists consider international law as a unified system of rules that emanates from the states' will. International law, as it is, is an "objective" reality that needs to be distinguished from law "as it should be". Classic positivism demands rigorous tests for legal validity and it deems irrelevant all extralegal arguments.

Alternative views 
This is affirmed in Article 2 (1) of the UN Charter, which holds that no state is in subjection to any other state. John Austin therefore asserted that "so-called" international law, lacking a sovereign power and so unenforceable, was not really law at all, but "positive morality", consisting of "opinions and sentiments...more ethical than legal in nature."

Because the bulk of international law comes from treaties, which are binding only on the parties that ratify or accede to them,
If legislation is the making of laws by a person or assembly binding on the whole community, there is no such thing as international law. For treaties bind only those who sign them.
On the subject of treaty law, Charles de Gaulle stated that "Treaties are like pretty girls, or roses; they last only as long as they last".

Since states are few in number, diverse and atypical in character, unindictable, lacking a centralised sovereign power, and their agreements unpoliced and decentralised, then, says Wight, 'international society is not a society at all. The condition of international relations is best described as international anarchy;'
While in domestic politics the struggle for power is governed and circumscribed by law, in international politics, law is governed and circumscribed by the struggle for power. (This is why) international politics is called power politics... War is the only means by which states can in the last resort defend vital interests...the causes of war are inherent in power politics.

Hans Morgenthau believed international law to be the weakest and most primitive system of law enforcement; he likened its decentralised nature to the law that prevails in preliterate tribal societies. Monopoly on violence is what makes domestic law enforceable; but between nations, there are multiple competing sources of force. The confusion created by treaty laws, which resemble private contracts between persons, is mitigated only by the relatively small number of states.  For example, it is unclear whether the Nuremberg trials created new law, or applied the existing law of the Kellogg-Briand pact.

Morgenthau asserts that no state may be compelled to submit a dispute to an international tribunal, making laws unenforceable and voluntary. International law is also unpoliced, lacking agencies for enforcement. He cites a 1947 US opinion poll in which 75% of respondents wanted "an international police to maintain world peace", but only 13% wanted that force to exceed the US armed forces. Later surveys have produced similar contradictory results.

See also

 Natural law
 List of International Court of Justice cases
 List of international public law topics
 List of treaties
 Consular law
 Arbitration
 Anarchy (international relations)
 Aviation law and Space law
 Centre for International Law (CIL)
 Commissions of the Danube River
 Comparative law
 Conference of the parties
 Conflict of laws
 Diplomatic law and Diplomatic recognition
 Environmental agreements
 Global administrative law
 Global policeman
 International Law Commission
 International litigation
 International community
 International constitutional law
 International Law Commission
 International regulation
 Internationalization of the Danube River
 INTERPOL
 Martens Clause
 Law
 Prize law
 Refugee law
 Speaking truth to power
 Space law
 Third World Approaches to International Law (TWAIL)
 UNIDROIT
 United Nations General Assembly Sixth Committee (Legal)
 Pacta sunt servanda (agreements are to be kept)
 Roerich Pact
 Rule of Law in Armed Conflicts Project (RULAC)

Further reading 

 I Brownlie, Principles of Public International Law (7th edn, Oxford University Press, 2008) 
 Dominique Carreau, Droit international, Pedone, 10e édition, 2009 .
 P.-M. Dupuy & Y. Kerbrat, "Droit international public" (10th ed., Paris, Dalloz, 2010) 
 
 
 Hafner-Burton, Emilie M.; Victor, David G.; Lupu, Yonatan (2012). "Political Science Research on International Law: The State of the Field". American Journal of International Law 106 (1):47–97.
 M. N. Shaw, International Law (5th ed Cambridge University Press 2003)
 Rafael Domingo Osle, The New Global Law (Cambridge University Press 2010)
 Giuliana Ziccardi Capaldo, "The Pillars of Global Law" (Ashgate 2008)
Hans Kelsen, Peace Through Law (1944) 
 Koremenos, Barbara (2016). The Continent of International Law: Explaining Agreement Design. Cambridge University Press.
 David L. Sloss, Michael D. Ramsey, William S. Dodge (2011) International Law in the U.S. Supreme Court, 0521119561, ISBN 978-0-521-11956-6	Cambridge University Press
 Rafael Domingo Osle and John Witte, Jr., eds, Christianity and Global Law (Routledge, 2020)

References

External links

 United Nations Rule of Law, the United Nations' centralised website on the rule of law
 UNOG Library Legal Research Guide
 International law overview
 Primary Legal Documents Critical to an Understanding of the Development of Public International Law
 Public International Law as a Form of Private Ordering
 Public International Law – Resources
 A Brief Primer on International Law With cases and commentary.  Nathaniel Burney, 2007.
 American Society of International Law – 100 Ways International Law Shapes Our Lives
 American Society of International Law – Resource Guide (Introduction)
 International Law Details
 International Law Observer – Blog dedicated to reports and commentary on International Law
 Official United Nations website
 Official UN website on International Law
 Official website of the International Court of Justice
 Opinio Juris – Blog on International Law and International Relations
 United Nations Treaty Collection
 UN – Audiovisual Library of International Law
 The European Institute for International Law and International Relations
 Public International Law as a Form of Private Ordering
 Public International Law, Research Guide  Peace Palace Library
 UNOG Library – Legal Research Guide

 
International trade law
International
International relations
Cultural globalization